The Minister of Foreign Affairs of Benin (known as Dahomey in 1960–75 and as the People's Republic of Benin in 1975–90) is a government minister in charge of the Ministry of Foreign Affairs of Benin, responsible for conducting foreign relations of the country.

The following is a list of foreign ministers of Benin since its founding in 1960:

1960............ Chabi Mama
1960–1962: Assogba Oké
1962–1963: Émile Derlin Zinsou
1963............ Hubert Maga
1963–1964: Chabi Mama
1964–1965: Gabriel Lozès
1965............ Tahirou Congacou 
1965–1967: Émile Derlin Zinsou
1967–1968: Benoît Sinzogan
1968–1969: Daouda Badarou
1969–1970: Benoît Sinzogan
1970–1971: Daouda Badarou
1971–1972: Michel Ahouanmènou
1972–1980: Michel Alladaye
1980–1982: Simon Ifede Ogouma
1982–1984: Tiamiou Adjibadé
1984–1987: Frédéric Affo
1987–1989: Guy Landry Hazoumé
1989–1990: Daniel Tawéma
1990–1991: Théophile Nata
1991–1992: Théodore Holo
1992–1993: Saturnin Soglo
1993–1995: Robert Dossou
1995–1996: Edgar Yves Monnou
1996–1998: Pierre Osho
1998–2003: Antoine Idji Kolawolé
2003............ Joseph Gnonlonfoun 
2003–2006: Rogatien Biaou   
2006............ Frédéric Dohou 
2006–2007: Mariam Aladji Boni Diallo
2007–2008: Moussa Okanla
2008–2011: Jean-Marie Ehouzou
2011–2015: Nassirou Bako Arifari
2015–2016: Saliou Akadiri
2016–present: Aurélien Agbénonci

References

Benin
Foreign Ministers
Politicians